Malthinus flaveolus is a species of soldier beetle native to Europe.

References

Cantharidae
Beetles described in 1786
Beetles of Europe